Alejandro "Álex" García Peña (born 24 September 1984) is a Spanish professional footballer who plays for Racing de Santander as a left winger.

Club career
Born in Bilbao, Biscay, García began his career with Racing de Santander, making his senior debuts in 2004–05 for the reserves after a loan spell at neighbouring Deportivo Rayo Cantabria. On 22 January 2006 he made his first-team – and La Liga – debut, appearing as a substitute in a 2–3 home loss against Sevilla FC and being released at the end of the season.

In summer 2006, García returned to his native Basque Country as he signed with Athletic Bilbao, but he only featured with the B-team in Segunda División B during his one-season spell. He went on to remain in that level in the following years with Villarreal CF B, Real Jaén, SD Eibar and CF Badalona.

On 2 July 2012, García signed with Segunda División club CD Guadalajara. On 8 December he made his first league appearance with his new team, against CD Numancia; he scored his first goal in the second tier on 7 April of the following year, contributing to a 3–1 home win over Córdoba CF.

References

External links

1984 births
Living people
Spanish footballers
Footballers from Bilbao
Association football wingers
La Liga players
Segunda División players
Segunda División B players
Tercera División players
Rayo Cantabria players
Deportivo Rayo Cantabria players
Racing de Santander players
Bilbao Athletic footballers
Villarreal CF B players
Real Jaén footballers
SD Eibar footballers
CF Badalona players
CD Guadalajara (Spain) footballers
Sestao River footballers
CD Mirandés footballers
CD Tenerife players